Yongding may refer to:

Yongding River, in Beijing
Yongding District, Longyan, a district in Longyan, Fujian
Yongding District, Zhangjiajie, a district in Zhangjiajie, Hunan
Yongding Subdistrict, a subdistrict in Yongding District, Zhangjiajie

Towns
Yongding, Beijing, in Mentougou District, Beijing
Yongding, Sichuan, in Nanbu County, Sichuan
Yongding, Xinjiang, in Huocheng County, Xinjiang
Yongding, Yunnan, in Fumin County, Yunnan